Sadgill is a hamlet in Longsleddale, Cumbria, England. It is a divided settlement, also containing Low Sadgill.

References

Hamlets in Cumbria
South Lakeland District